2357 Phereclos  is a large Jupiter trojan from the Trojan camp, approximately  in diameter. It was discovered on 1 January 1981, by American astronomer Edward Bowell at the Anderson Mesa Station near Flagstaff, Arizona, in the United States. The dark and possibly spherical D-type asteroid belongs to the 30 largest Jupiter trojans and has a rotation period of 14.4 hours. It was named after the shipbuilder Phereclos from Greek mythology.

Orbit and classification 

Cebriones is a dark Jovian asteroid orbiting in the trailing Trojan camp at Jupiter's  Lagrangian point, 60° behind its orbit in a 1:1 resonance (see Trojans in astronomy). This Jupiter trojan is also a non-family asteroid of the Jovian background population.

It orbits the Sun at a distance of 5.0–5.4 AU once every 11 years and 11 months (4,344 days; semi-major axis of 5.21 AU). Its orbit has an eccentricity of 0.05 and an inclination of 3° with respect to the ecliptic. The body's observation arc begins at Lowell one month later with a precovery taken in October 1929, or more than 51 years prior to its official discovery observation at Anderson Mesa.

Physical characteristics 

Phereclos is a dark D-type asteroid, according to the Tholen classification, the SDSS-based taxonomy and the survey conducted by Pan-STARRS.

Rotation period 

In July 2010, a rotational lightcurve of Phereclos was obtained from photometric observations by Stefano Mottola using the 1.2-meter telescope at Calar Alto Observatory in Spain. Lightcurve analysis gave a rotation period of 14.394 hours with a low brightness variation of 0.09 magnitude, indicative of a nearly spherical shape.

Between 2010 and 2017, photometric follow-up observations by Robert Stephens at the Center for Solar System Studies, California, gave several, concurring periods of 7.16 (half-period), 14.345 and 14.49 hours.

Diameter and albedo 

According to the surveys carried out by the Infrared Astronomical Satellite IRAS, the Japanese Akari satellite and the NEOWISE mission of NASA's Wide-field Infrared Survey Explorer, Phereclos measures between 94.62 and 98.45 kilometers in diameter and its surface has an albedo between 0.049 and 0.0521.

The Collaborative Asteroid Lightcurve Link adopts the results obtained by IRAS, that is, an albedo of 0.0521 and a diameter of 94.90 kilometers based on an absolute magnitude of 8.94.

Naming 

This minor planet was named from Greek mythology after the skilled craftsman and shipbuilder Phereclos (Phereclus; Phereklos), who constructed the ship that Paris used to kidnap Helen. During the Trojan War, he was killed by the Greek hero Meriones. The official naming citation was published by the Minor Planet Center on 1 August 1981.

Notes

References

External links 
 Asteroid Lightcurve Database (LCDB), query form (info )
 Dictionary of Minor Planet Names, Google books
 Discovery Circumstances: Numbered Minor Planets (1)-(5000) – Minor Planet Center
 
 

002357
Discoveries by Edward L. G. Bowell
Named minor planets
002357
19810101